Abhinay Muthoo is an economist specializing in negotiations, game theory and public policy.  

Abhinay has 37 years of teaching and research experience, across several universities including Bristol, Cambridge, Essex, Warwick and the LSE. He has been the Head of the Departments of Economics at Essex and at Warwick, and the Dean of Warwick in London.

He is a Fellow of the National Institute of Economic and Social Research and a member of the UK Cross Parliamentary Party Youth Violence Commission.

Education
He studied for a BSc in Economics at the London School of Economics which he obtained with First Class Honours, before proceeding to obtain his MPhil and PhD in Economics at the University of Cambridge, where he was supervised by David Canning and Partha Dasgupta, and his doctoral thesis were examined by Kenneth Binmore and Frank Hahn.

Academic career
Abhinay was a Professor of Economics at the University of Warwick between 2008 and 2022. During that period, he was the Head of Department of Economics for eight years (2008-2016) and the Dean of Warwick in London for four years (2016-2020). Prior to that, he was a professor at the University of Essex and held positions at Harvard University, London School of Economics, Panthéon-Assas University, University of Bristol and the University of Cambridge.   He was the Head of the Department of Economics at the University of Essex for seven years.

Research
Muthoo's research interests include art and science of negotiations, Conflict, Dispute Resolution, Game Theory, Bargaining, Law and Economics, Political Institutions, Political Economy, Coalition Formation, Foundations of Social Order, Family, International Development, International Relations, Public Policy, Higher Education, Economics and Literature, and Political Philosophy.

He authored the book Bargaining Theory with Applications.

He also publicly commented on capitalism, university leadership and immigration rules.

References

Academics of the University of Warwick
Alumni of King's College, Cambridge
Harvard University faculty
1963 births
Alumni of the London School of Economics
Living people